Jack de Sequeira (Born João Hugo Eduardo de Sequeira; 20 April 1915 – 19 February 1989), popularly known as Dr Jack de Sequeira; also known as Jak Siker according to local naming conventions, was an Indian politician and is widely considered in Goa to be the "Father of the Opinion Poll", which led to the former territory attaining statehood in 1987. 

He was Goa's first Leader of the Opposition when the Legislative Assembly was launched in 1963. He was born to Goan parents in British Burma, and shaped politics in Goa during the 1960s and 1970s in particular.

United Goans Party
Sequeira was the founder president of the United Goans Party. He played a pivotal role in convincing the government of India to hold an opinion poll to decide the issue of the merger of Goa into the state of Maharashtra.

Early and personal life 

Dr. Sequeira was born in British Burma (now Myanmar) on 20 April 1915, to Mr. Erasmo de Sequeira and Mrs. Ana Julia de Sa e Sequeira.

After completing schooling in Portuguese medium at the Lyceum, he studied medicine at Escola Médica de Goa. However, his father died when he was 21, forcing him to discontinue studies in order to look after the family business.

At the age of 23, he married Lilia Margarida de Gouveia Pinto. They had nine children.

He died on 17 October 1989, aged 74.

Political career
Sequeira was the leader of a group known as Goyncho Pokx, which later merged with other groups to from the United Goans Party (UGP or UG Party).

Dr. Jack de Sequeira was the founder president of the United Goans Party.
He represented Santa Cruz assembly constituency three times. He lost in the fourth attempt in 1979 and did not contest elections again.

Role in Goa Opinion Poll

Goa was annexed into India by an Indian Army operation on 19 December 1961. It was integrated into the Indian Union in 1962.

Goa's first polls were held on 9 December 1963.

The two main parties UGP and MGP were formed with two opposing ideologies. The MGP wanted to merge the state of Goa into the newly formed state of Maharashtra whereas UGP wanted to retain independent statehood for the former Portuguese enclaves.

The United Goans Party (UGP) was formed in 1962-63 following the merger of three local parties. Dr Sequeira was its founding president.

Of the 30 seats in the assembly 28 belonged to Goa, and one each to Daman and Diu. MGP formed the government, having secured 16 seats while UGP secured 12. The assembly of Goa, Daman and Diu convened on 9 January 1964. Dayanand Bandodkar of MGP became the first Chief Minister.

The MGP and politicians in Maharashtra were elated at the victory and touted it as a mandate that the majority of  Goans were in favour of merger.

At the time of Goa’s accession into India, Prime Minister Jawaharlal Nehru had categorically stated that Goa would retain its distinct identity. Following MGPs victory and the raised pitch for merger. Dr. Sequeira visited New Delhi along with his MLAs and impressed Nehru about the need of an opinion poll on this matter . However Nehru died before Parliament  could take this decision and Lal Bahadur Shastri succeeded  him as Prime Minister.  A delegation consisting of MGP MLAs and Maharashtra’s leaders went to New Delhi to convince him that a vote on the merger should be conducted in the Goa Assembly.

Dr. Sequeira, along with others went to Bangalore where an AICC session was being held and met Shastri. They opposed the move to get the merger voted in the Assembly and impressed on Shastri and Kamraj, the need to put this question before the people of Goa themselves.

Dr. Sequeira shrewdly managed to get the backing of the legislators of Mysore state( now Karnataka). He impressed them that if Maharashtra managed to convince the centre to merge Goa into Maharashra, it would only bolster their case for Karwar and Supa.

However Shastri died in 1966 in Tashkent and this decision was now left to the new Prime Minister Indira Gandhi. Again Dr. Jack and his legislators met the new Prime Minister and submitted a memorandum that such a monumental decision affecting the future of the State could not be left to legislators alone, but should be put before the people to decide. The referendum could be conducted via a signature campaign or by secret ballot.  Since a large number of Goans worked outside Goa, and indeed, outside India itself as expats, UGP demanded that these expats should be allowed to vote by postal ballot. Parliament finally agreed to conduct a referendum by means of secret ballot but ruled out postal ballots.

Now that the referendum would be conducted, Dr. Sequeira feared that Bandodkar may use the state’s administrative and law-enforcement machinery to browbeat the anti-mergerists into submission. The UGP demanded that the MGP government resign so that the referendum could be conducted in a free-and-fair atmosphere. On 3 December 1966, the MGP government resigned.

Dr. Sequeira also traveled extensively exhorting people to vote against the merger. In this cause, he also visited places such as Colaba and Kalyan in Bombay, convincing Goans staying there to support the cause.

Electoral results

The opinion poll was held on 16 January 1967. A total of 3,17,633 votes were polled. The merger was defeated by 34,021 votes.

In 1963, Sequeira won Panjim with 2761 votes (42.02%) as against 2347 for the MGP (35.72%), 1371  for the Congress (20.87%) and 91 votes (1.39%) for Independents.

In 1967, 1972 and 1977, Sequeira contested the Santa Cruz constituency, for the first two times on a UGP ticket, and on a Janata Party ticket on the last occasion, after the merger of the UGP into the Janata Party.

In 1967, he got 7087 (59.94%) votes, as against 121 (1.02%) by the MGP, and 570 (4.82%) by Independents. His main rival was a UG (Furtado) candidate, contesting on behalf of a party that had broken away from his. The UG (Furtado) party won 4045 votes (34.21%).

In the 1972 elections, he retained the seat with 6586 votes (57.51%), with his closest Independent rival gaining 4483 (39.15%) votes.

In 1977, Sequeira retained Santa Cruz with 4462 votes (46.11%), beating the MGP which scored 2656 (27.45%) votes.

In his analysis of the 1963 Goa elections, Ram Joshi argues that the
urban Hindu elite, perhaps more ambitious politically, was more inclined to vote for a party which stood for separate statehood. Many of them supported the United Goans which explains the success of Dr. Jack Sequeira, the leader of the United Goans Party, in Panjim where there were only 2,839 Christian voters as against 5,130 Hindu voters

Legacy 

On 16 January 2007 a life sized statue of Dr. Jack was inaugurated at Calangute. Another statue was inaugurated on 20 April 2007 at Dona Paula. The cost of  the statue was borne by his family and not by the government. A third statue will be installed in Salcette. 
 
The road from Miramar to Dona Paula & Merces junction to Merces has also been named after him.

See also
Goa Opinion Poll
United Goans Party
Erasmo de Sequeira
Alvaro de Loyola Furtado

References

1915 births
1989 deaths
Leaders of the Opposition in Goa
Goa, Daman and Diu MLAs 1963–1967
Burmese people of Goan descent
People from Panaji
United Goans Party politicians
Janata Party politicians